13 Air Assault Support Regiment RLC is a regiment of the Royal Logistic Corps of the British Army.

History
The regiment was formed in 1999, upon the formation of 16 Air Assault Brigade, in order to provide logistical support to the brigade.

Structure
The regiment's current structure is as follows:
24 Headquarters Squadron
47 Air Despatch Squadron
15 Air Assault Support Squadron (Gurkha)
63 Air Assault Support Squadron
82 Air Assault Support Squadron
8 Parachute Field Company, Royal Electrical and Mechanical Engineers

References

Airborne units and formations of the United Kingdom
Military units and formations established in 1999
Regiments of the Royal Logistic Corps